Five Names for Johnny is a 1957 mystery serial written by Lewis Greifer, which was produced by ATV and aired on ITV. Cast included Conrad Phillips, Norman Wooland, and Patricia Marmont. It was a half-hour series. The 7-part serial still exists in the archives.

See also
The Man Who Finally Died
The Voodoo Factor
The Gentle Killers
Motive for Murder

References

External links
 

1957 British television series debuts
1957 British television series endings
1950s British drama television series
1950s British television miniseries
Black-and-white British television shows
English-language television shows
ITV television dramas
Television series by ITV Studios
Television shows produced by Associated Television (ATV)